Ganj Dundawara is a city and a municipal board in Kasganj District and the Aligarh zone in the state Uttar Pradesh, India. Sanjeev Kumar Gupta Mahajan, of the BJP is current mayor of Nagar Palika Parishad Ganjdundwara

Geography
Ganj Dundawara is located at 27.43°N latitude and 78.56°E longitude. The city is situated in Gangatic plain. The Ganges is the nearest holy river to the city.

Demographics
As per the 2011 Indian Census, Ganj Dundawara had a total population of 45,385, of which 23,801 were males and 21,584 were females. Population within the age group of 0 to 6 years was 6,746. The total number of literates in Ganj Dundawara was 23,245, which constituted 51.2% of the population, with male literacy of 55.7% and female literacy of 46.3%. The effective literacy rate of 7+ population of Ganj Dundawara was 60.2%, of which male literacy rate was 65.4% and female literacy rate was 54.4%. The Scheduled Castes population was 4,361. Ganj Dundawara had 6981 households in 2011.

According to the 2001 India census, Ganj Dundawara had a population of 41,245, with 53% males and 47% female. It had an average crude literacy rate of 44%, lower than the national average of 59.5%: male literacy is 51%, and female literacy is 38%. 18% of the population was under 6 years of age.

Climate
Ganj Dundawara has a humid subtropical climate. The winters are moderate. The summers are hot and dry, with temperatures regularly exceeding . The monsoon season runs from the end of June to September. During the monsoon season, almost daily showers are a common phenomenon. From October onward, the weather is pleasant. Proper winter begins in early December.

Transport 
Ganj Dundawara is situated on the Kanpur-Kasganj-Mathura electrified railway line. Trains are available to various major cities. The main express train which stops at Ganj Dundawara is the Ahmedabad-Gorakghpur Express (19409/19410). The town is connected to the district headquarters, Kasganj, by railway and road. UPSRTC provides various bus services from Ganj Dundwara to Etah, Delhi, Agra, Aligarh and Bareilly.

Notable people
 Anup Upadhyay – stage, film and television actor

References

Cities and towns in Kasganj district